Ministry of Transportation and Construction was formed on 31 October 2005, from transformation of Ministry of Infrastructure.

It was abolished on 5 May 2006 as a result of signing a coalition agreement between the Law and Justice party, Self-Defense and the LPR. It was replaced by Ministry of Transport, Ministry of Construction and Ministry of Marine Economy.

Headquarters
The building of the Ministry of Communication is a modernist office building at 4/6 Tytusa Chałubińskiego Street in Warsaw, erected between 1929 and 1931, designed by Rudolf Świerczyński.

In the years 1948-1950 the complex of buildings was significantly expanded according to the design of Bohdan Pniewski. The high-rise part can be considered as the first skyscraper built in Warsaw, and probably in the whole country after World War II.

In the period 1945-2000 the Polish State Railways were also managed from this building.

Ministers of Transportation and Construction

References

External links
 Official government website of Poland

Poland, Transport, Construction and Marine Economy
Transport, Construction and Maritime Economy
Poland, Transport, Construction and Maritime Economy
Poland
Poland
Transport organisations based in Poland